Spermatogenesis-associated protein 5 is a protein that in humans is encoded by the SPATA5 gene.

References

Further reading